Jacques René Chirac (29 November 193226 September 2019) was a French politician who served as President of France from 1995 to 2007. Chirac was previously Prime Minister of France from 1974 to 1976 and from 1986 to 1988, as well as Mayor of Paris from 1977 to 1995.

Chirac occupied various senior positions, including Minister of Agriculture and Minister of the Interior. In 1981 and 1988, he unsuccessfully ran for president as the standard-bearer for the conservative Gaullist party Rally for the Republic. Chirac's internal policies initially included lower tax rates, the removal of price controls, strong punishment for crime and terrorism, and business privatisation. After pursuing these policies in his second term as prime minister, he changed his views. He argued for different economic policies and was elected president in 1995, with 52.6% of the vote in the second round, beating Socialist Lionel Jospin, after campaigning on a platform of healing the "social rift" (.

He was also known for his stand against the American-led invasion of Iraq, his recognition of the collaborationist French Government's role in deporting Jews, and his reduction of the presidential term from 7 years to 5 through a referendum in 2000. At the 2002 French presidential election, he won 82.2% of the vote in the second round against the far-right candidate, Jean-Marie Le Pen, and was the last president to be re-elected until 2022.

In 2011, the Paris court declared Chirac guilty of diverting public funds and abusing public confidence, giving him a two-year suspended prison sentence.

Early life and education

Family background 
Jacques René Chirac was born on 29 November 1932 in the 5th arrondissement of Paris. He was the son of Abel François Marie Chirac (1898–1968), a successful executive for an aircraft company, and Marie-Louise Valette (1902–1973), a housewife.

He was a Catholic.

Chirac was an only child (his elder sister, Jacqueline, died in infancy nearly ten years before his birth). After his , behind his father's back he went off to serve for three months as a sailor on a coal-transport.

Chirac played rugby union for Brive's youth team, and also played at university level. He played no. 8 and second row. At age 18, his ambition was to become a ship's captain.

Education and early career 
At age 16, Chirac wanted to learn Sanskrit and found a White Russian Sanskrit teacher in Paris who ended up teaching him Russian; by age 17 Chirac was almost fluent in Russian. Inspired by Charles de Gaulle, Chirac started to pursue a civil service career in the 1950s. In 1950, he signed the Soviet-inspired Stockholm Appeal for the abolition of nuclear weapons – which led him to be questioned when he applied for his first visa to the United States.

In the United States, Chirac worked at Anheuser-Busch in St. Louis, Missouri.

Chirac trained as a reserve military officer in armoured cavalry at Saumur. He then volunteered to fight in the Algerian War, using personal connections to be sent despite the reservations of his superiors. His superiors did not want to make him an officer because they suspected he had communist leanings. In 1965, he became an auditor in the Court of Auditors.

Early political career

The "Bulldozer": 1962–1971 
In April 1962, Chirac was appointed head of the personal staff of Prime Minister Georges Pompidou. This appointment launched Chirac's political career. Pompidou considered Chirac his protégé, and referred to him as "my bulldozer" for his skill at getting things done. The nickname  caught on in French political circles, where it also referred to his abrasive manner. As late as the 1988 presidential election, Chirac maintained this reputation.

At Pompidou's suggestion, Chirac ran as a Gaullist for a seat in the National Assembly in 1967. He was elected deputy for his home Corrèze , a stronghold of the left. This surprising victory in the context of a Gaullist ebb permitted him to enter the government as Minister of Social Affairs. Although Chirac was well-situated in de Gaulle's entourage, being related by marriage to the general's sole companion at the time of the Appeal of 18 June 1940, he was more of a "Pompidolian" than a "Gaullist". When student and worker unrest rocked France in May 1968, Chirac played a central role in negotiating a truce. Then, as state secretary of economy (1968–1971), he worked closely with Valéry Giscard d'Estaing, who headed the ministry of economy and finance.

Cabinet minister: 1971–1974 
After some months in the ministry for Relations with Parliament, Chirac's first high-level post came in 1972 when he became Minister of Agriculture and Rural Development under Pompidou, who had been elected president in 1969, after de Gaulle retired. Chirac quickly earned a reputation as a champion of French farmers' interests, and first attracted international attention when he assailed U.S., West German, and European Commission agricultural policies which conflicted with French interests.

On 27 February 1974, after the resignation of Raymond Marcellin, Chirac was appointed Minister of the Interior. From March 1974, he was entrusted by President Pompidou with preparations for the presidential election then scheduled for 1976. These elections were moved forward because of Pompidou's sudden death on 2 April 1974.

Chirac vainly attempted to rally Gaullists behind Prime Minister Pierre Messmer. Jacques Chaban-Delmas announced his candidacy in spite of the disapproval of the "Pompidolians". Chirac and others published the call of the 43 in favour of Giscard d'Estaing, the leader of the non-Gaullist part of the parliamentary majority. Giscard d'Estaing was elected as Pompidou's successor after France's most competitive election campaign in years. In return, the new president chose Chirac to lead the cabinet.

Prime Minister of Giscard: 1974–1976 

When Valéry Giscard d'Estaing became president, he nominated Chirac as prime minister on 27 May 1974, to reconcile the "Giscardian" and "non-Giscardian" factions of the parliamentary majority. In December 1974, he took the lead of the Union of Democrats for the Republic (UDR) against the will of its more senior personalities.

As prime minister, Chirac quickly set about persuading the Gaullists that, despite the social reforms proposed by President Giscard, the basic tenets of Gaullism, such as national and European independence, would be retained. Chirac was advised by Pierre Juillet and Marie-France Garaud, two former advisers of Pompidou. These two organised the campaign against Chaban-Delmas in 1974. They advocated a clash with Giscard d'Estaing because they thought his policy bewildered the conservative electorate.

Citing Giscard's unwillingness to give him authority, Chirac resigned as prime minister in 1976. He proceeded to build up his political base among France's several conservative parties, with a goal of reconstituting the Gaullist UDR into a Neo-Gaullist group, the Rally for the Republic (RPR). Chirac's first tenure as prime minister was also an arguably progressive one, with improvements in both the minimum wage and the social welfare system carried out during the course of his premiership.

Mayor of Paris: 1977–1995 
After his departure from the cabinet, Chirac wanted to gain the leadership of the political right, to gain the French presidency in the future. The RPR was conceived as an electoral machine against President Giscard d'Estaing. Paradoxically, Chirac benefited from Giscard's decision to create the office of mayor in Paris, which had been in abeyance since the 1871 Commune, because the leaders of the Third Republic (1871–1940) feared that having municipal control of the capital would give the mayor too much power. In 1977, Chirac stood as a candidate against Michel d'Ornano, a close friend of the president, and he won. As mayor of Paris, Chirac's political influence grew. He held this post until 1995.

Chirac supporters point out that, as mayor, he provided programmes to help the elderly, people with disabilities, and single mothers, and introduced the street-cleaning Motocrotte, while providing incentives for businesses to stay in Paris. His opponents contend that he installed "clientelist" policies.

Governmental opposition

Struggle for the right-wing leadership: 1976–1986 
Hospitalised in  after a car crash, he declared that "as always about the drooping of France, the pro-foreign party acts with its peaceable and reassuring voice". He appointed Yvan Blot, an intellectual who would later join the National Front, as director of his campaigns for the 1979 European election.

After the poor results of the election, Chirac broke with Garaud and Juillet. Vexed Marie-France Garaud stated: "We thought Chirac was made of the same marble of which statues are carved in, we perceive he's of the same faience bidets are made of." His rivalry with Giscard d'Estaing intensified. Although it has been often interpreted by historians as the struggle between two rival French right-wing families (the Bonapartists, represented by Chirac, and the Orleanists, represented by VGE), both figures in fact were members of the liberal, Orleanist tradition, according to historian Alain-Gérard Slama. But the eviction of the Gaullist barons and of President Giscard d'Estaing convinced Chirac to assume a strong neo-Gaullist stance.

Chirac made his first run for president against Giscard d'Estaing in the 1981 election, thus splitting the centre-right vote. He was eliminated in the first round with 18% of the vote. He reluctantly supported Giscard in the second round. He refused to give instructions to the RPR voters but said that he supported the incumbent president "in a private capacity", which was interpreted as almost de facto support of the Socialist Party's (PS) candidate, François Mitterrand, who was elected by a broad majority.

Giscard has always blamed Chirac for his defeat. He was told by Mitterrand, before his death, that the latter had dined with Chirac before the election. Chirac told the Socialist candidate that he wanted to "get rid of Giscard". In his memoirs, Giscard wrote that between the two rounds, he phoned the RPR headquarters. He passed himself off, as a right-wing voter, by changing his voice. The RPR employee advised him "certainly do not vote Giscard!" After 1981, the relationship between the two men became tense, with Giscard, even though he had been in the same government coalition as Chirac, criticising Chirac's actions openly.

After the May 1981 presidential election, the right also lost the subsequent legislative election that year. However, as Giscard had been knocked out, Chirac appeared as the principal leader of the right-wing opposition. Due to his attacks against the economic policy of the Socialist government, he gradually aligned himself with prevailing economically liberal opinion, even though it did not correspond with Gaullist doctrine. While the far-right National Front grew, taking advantage of the proportional representation electoral system which had been introduced for the 1986 legislative elections, he signed an electoral pact with the Giscardian (and more or less Christian Democratic) party Union for French Democracy (UDF).

Prime Minister of Mitterrand: 1986–1988 

When the RPR/UDF right-wing coalition won a slight majority in the National Assembly in the 1986 election, Mitterrand (PS) appointed Chirac prime minister (though many in Mitterrand's inner circle lobbied him to choose Jacques Chaban-Delmas instead). This unprecedented power-sharing arrangement, known as cohabitation, gave Chirac the lead in domestic affairs. However, it is generally conceded that Mitterrand used the areas granted to the President of the Republic, or "reserved domains" of the Presidency, Defence and Foreign Affairs, to belittle his prime minister.

Chirac's cabinet sold many public companies, renewing the liberalisation initiated under Laurent Fabius's Socialist government of 1984–1986, and abolished the solidarity tax on wealth (ISF), a symbolic tax on those with high value assets introduced by Mitterrand's government. Elsewhere, the plan for university reform (plan Devaquet) caused a crisis in 1986 when a student called Malik Oussekine was killed by the police, leading to massive demonstrations and the proposal's withdrawal. It has been said during other student crises that this event strongly affected Jacques Chirac, who was afterwards careful about possible police violence during such demonstrations (e.g., maybe explaining part of the decision to "promulgate without applying" the First Employment Contract (CPE) after large student demonstrations against it).

One of his first acts concerning foreign policy was to call back Jacques Foccart (1913–1997), who had been de Gaulle's and his successors' leading counsellor for African matters, called by journalist Stephen Smith the "father of all "networks" on the continent, at the time [in 1986] aged 72." Foccart, who had also co-founded the Gaullist SAC militia (dissolved by Mitterrand in 1982 after the Auriol massacre) along with Charles Pasqua, and who was a key component of the  system, was again called to the Elysée Palace when Chirac won the 1995 presidential election. Furthermore, confronted by anti-colonialist movements in New Caledonia, Prime Minister Chirac ordered a military intervention against the separatists in the Ouvéa cave, leading to the deaths of 19 militants. He allegedly refused any alliance with Jean-Marie Le Pen's .

Crossing the desert: 1988–1995 
Chirac ran against Mitterrand for a second time in the 1988 election. He obtained 20 per cent of the vote in the first round, but lost the second with only 46 per cent. He resigned from the cabinet and the right lost the next legislative election.

For the first time, his leadership over the RPR was challenged. Charles Pasqua and Philippe Séguin criticised his abandonment of Gaullist doctrines. On the right, a new generation of politicians, the "renovation men", accused Chirac and Giscard of being responsible for the electoral defeats. In 1992, convinced a candidate could not become president whilst advocating anti-European policies, he called for a "yes" vote in the referendum on the Maastricht Treaty, against the opinion of Pasqua, Séguin and a majority of the RPR voters, who chose to vote "no".

While he still was mayor of Paris (since 1977), Chirac went to Abidjan ( where he supported President Houphouët-Boigny (1960–1993), although the latter was being called a "thief" by the local population. Chirac then declared that multipartism was a "kind of luxury".

Nevertheless, the right won the 1993 legislative election. Chirac announced that he did not want to come back as prime minister as his previous term had ended with his unsuccessful run for the presidency against Mitterrand who was still president at this point.

Chirac instead suggested the appointment of Edouard Balladur, who had promised that he would not run for the presidency against Chirac in 1995. However, benefiting from positive polls, Balladur decided to be a presidential candidate, with the support of a majority of right-wing politicians. Balladur broke from Chirac along with a number of friends and allies, including Charles Pasqua, Nicolas Sarkozy, etc., who supported his candidacy. A small group of  would remain with Chirac, including Alain Juppé and Jean-Louis Debré. When Nicolas Sarkozy became president in 2007, Juppé was one of the few  to serve in François Fillon's government.

Presidency (1995–2007)

First term: 1995–2002

Juppé ministry 

During the 1995 presidential campaign, Chirac criticised the "sole thought" ( of neoliberalism represented by his challenger on the right and promised to reduce the "social fracture", placing himself more to the centre and thus forcing Balladur to radicalise himself. Ultimately, he obtained more votes than Balladur in the first round (20.8 per cent), and then defeated the Socialist candidate Lionel Jospin in the second round (52.6 per cent).

Chirac was elected on a platform of tax cuts and job programmes, but his policies did little to ease the labour strikes during his first months in office. On the domestic front, neo-liberal economic austerity measures introduced by Chirac and his conservative prime minister Alain Juppé, including budgetary cutbacks, proved highly unpopular. At about the same time, it became apparent that Juppé and others had obtained preferential conditions for public housing, as well as other perks. At the year's end Chirac faced major workers' strikes which turned, in November–December 1995, into a general strike, one of the largest since May 1968. The demonstrations were largely pitted against Juppé's plan for pension reform, and ultimately led to his dismissal.

Shortly after taking office, Chiracundaunted by international protests by environmental groupsinsisted upon the resumption of nuclear tests at Mururoa Atoll in French Polynesia in 1995, a few months before signing the Comprehensive Test Ban Treaty. Reacting to criticism, Chirac said, "You only have to look back at 1935...There were people then who were against France arming itself, and look what happened." On 1 February 1996, Chirac announced that France had ended "once and for all" its nuclear testing and intended to accede to the Comprehensive Test Ban Treaty.

Elected as President of the Republic, he refused to discuss the existence of French military bases in Africa, despite requests by the Ministry of Defence and the Ministry of Foreign Affairs. The French Army thus remained in Côte d'Ivoire as well as in Omar Bongo's Gabon.

State responsibility for the roundup of Jews 

Prior to 1995, the French government had maintained that the French Republic had been dismantled when Philippe Pétain instituted a new French State during World War II and that the Republic had been re-established when the war was over. It was not for France, therefore, to apologise for the roundup of Jews for deportation that happened while the Republic had not existed and was carried out by a state, Vichy France, which it did not recognise. President François Mitterrand had reiterated this position: "The Republic had nothing to do with this. I do not believe France is responsible," he said in September 1994.

Chirac was the first president of France to take responsibility for the deportation of Jews during the Vichy regime. In a speech made on 16 July 1995 at the site of the Vel' d'Hiv Roundup, where 13,000 Jews had been held for deportation to concentration camps in July 1942, Chirac said, "France, on that day, committed the irreparable". Those responsible for the roundup were "4,500 policemen and gendarmes, French, under the authority of their leaders [who] obeyed the demands of the Nazis. ... the criminal folly of the occupiers was seconded by the French, by the French State".

"Cohabitation" with Jospin 
In 1997, Chirac dissolved parliament for early legislative elections in a gamble designed to bolster support for his conservative economic program. But instead, it created an uproar, and his power was weakened by the subsequent backlash. The Socialist Party (PS), joined by other parties on the left, soundly defeated Chirac's conservative allies, forcing Chirac into a new period of cohabitation with Jospin as prime minister (1997–2002), which lasted five years.

Cohabitation significantly weakened the power of Chirac's presidency. The French president, by a constitutional convention, only controls foreign and military policy— and even then, allocation of funding is under the control of Parliament and under the significant influence of the prime minister. Short of dissolving parliament and calling for new elections, the president was left with little power to influence public policy regarding crime, the economy, and public services. Chirac seized the occasion to periodically criticise Jospin's government.

His position was weakened by scandals about the financing of RPR by Paris municipality. In 2001, the left, represented by Bertrand Delanoë (PS), won a majority on the city council of the capital. Tiberi was finally expelled from the Rally for the Republic, Chirac's party, on 12 October 2000, declaring to the magazine  on 18 November 2000: "Jacques Chirac is not my friend anymore".

During his two terms, he increased the Elysee Palace's total budget by 105 per cent (to €90 million, whereas 20 years before it was the equivalent of €43.7 million). He doubled the number of presidential cars – to 61 cars and seven scooters in the Palace's garage. He hired 145 extra employees – the total number of the people he employed simultaneously was 963.

Defence policy 

As the Supreme Commander of the French armed forces, he reduced the military budget, as did his predecessor. At the end of his first term it accounted for three per cent of GDP. In 1997 the aircraft carrier Clemenceau was decommissioned after 37 years of service, with her sister ship Foch decommissioned in 2000 after 37 years of service, leaving the French Navy with no aircraft carrier until 2001, when Charles de Gaulle was commissioned. He also reduced expenditure on nuclear weapons and the French nuclear arsenal was reduced to include 350 warheads, compared to the Russian nuclear arsenal of 16,000 warheads. He also published a plan to reduce the number of fighters the French military had by 30.

After François Mitterrand left office in 1995, Chirac began a rapprochement with NATO by joining the Military Committee and attempting to negotiate a return to the integrated military command, which failed after the French demand for parity with the United States went unmet. The possibility of a further attempt foundered after Chirac was forced into cohabitation with a Socialist-led cabinet between 1997 and 2002, then poor Franco-American relations after the French UN veto threat over Iraq in 2003 made transatlantic negotiations impossible.

Close call 
On 25 July 2000, as Chirac and the first lady were returning from the G7 Summit in Okinawa, Japan, they were placed in a dangerous situation by Air France Flight 4590 after they landed at Charles de Gaulle International Airport. The first couple were in an Air France Boeing 747 taxiing toward the terminal when the jet had to stop and wait for Flight 4590 to take off. The departing plane, an Aérospatiale-BAC Concorde, ran over a strip of metal on takeoff puncturing its left fuel tank and sliced electrical wires near the left landing gear. The sequence of events ignited a large fire and caused the Concorde to veer left on its takeoff roll. As it reached takeoff speed and lifted off the ground, it came within 30 feet of hitting Chirac's 747. The photograph of Flight 4590 ablaze, the only picture taken of the Concorde on fire, was taken by passenger Toshihiko Sato on Chirac's jetliner.

Second term: 2002–2007 

At the age of 69, Chirac faced his fourth presidential campaign in 2002. He received 20% of the vote in the first ballot of the presidential elections in April 2002. It had been expected that he would face incumbent prime minister Lionel Jospin (PS) in the second round of elections; instead, Chirac faced far-right politician Jean-Marie Le Pen of the National Front (FN), who came in 200,000 votes ahead of Jospin. All parties other than the National Front (except for ) called for opposing Le Pen, even if it meant voting for Chirac. The 14-day period between the two rounds of voting was marked by demonstrations against Le Pen and slogans such as "Vote for the crook, not for the fascist" or "Vote with a clothespin on your nose". Chirac won re-election by a landslide, with 82 per cent of the vote on the second ballot. However, Chirac became increasingly unpopular during his second term. According to a July 2005 poll, 37 per cent judged Chirac favourably and 63 per cent unfavorably. In 2006, The Economist wrote that Chirac "is the most unpopular occupant of the Elysée Palace in the fifth republic's history."

Early term 
As the left-wing Socialist Party was in thorough disarray following Jospin's defeat, Chirac reorganised politics on the right, establishing a new party – initially called the Union of the Presidential Majority, then the Union for a Popular Movement (UMP). The RPR had broken down; a number of members had formed Eurosceptic breakaways. While the Giscardian liberals of the Union for French Democracy (UDF) had moved to the right, the UMP won the parliamentary elections that followed the presidential poll with ease.

During an official visit to Madagascar on 21 July 2005, Chirac described the repression of the 1947 Malagasy uprising, which left between 80,000 and 90,000 dead, as "unacceptable".

Despite past opposition to state intervention the Chirac government approved a €2.8 billion aid package to troubled manufacturing giant Alstom. In October 2004, Chirac signed a trade agreement with PRC president Hu Jintao where Alstom was given €1 billion in contracts and promises of future investment in China.

Assassination attempt 
On 14 July 2002, during Bastille Day celebrations, Chirac survived an assassination attempt by a lone gunman with a rifle hidden in a guitar case. The would-be assassin fired a shot toward the presidential motorcade, before being overpowered by bystanders. The gunman, Maxime Brunerie, underwent psychiatric testing; the violent far-right group with which he was associated, was thence administratively dissolved.

Foreign policy 

Along with Vladimir Putin (whom he called "a personal friend"), Hu Jintao, and Gerhard Schröder, Chirac emerged as a leading voice against George W. Bush and Tony Blair in 2003 during the organisation and deployment of American and British forces participating in a military coalition to forcibly remove the government of Iraq controlled by the Ba'ath Party under the leadership of Saddam Hussein that resulted in the 2003–2011 Iraq War.

Despite British and American pressure, Chirac threatened to veto, at that given point, a resolution in the UN Security Council that would authorise the use of military force to rid Iraq of alleged weapons of mass destruction, and rallied other governments to his position. "Iraq today does not represent an immediate threat that justifies an immediate war", Chirac said on 18 March 2003. Future prime minister Dominique de Villepin acquired much of his popularity for his speech against the war at the United Nations (UN).

After Togo's leader Gnassingbé Eyadéma's death on 5 February 2005, Chirac gave him tribute and supported his son, Faure Gnassingbé, who has since succeeded his father.

On 19 January 2006, Chirac said that France was prepared to launch a nuclear strike against any country that sponsors a terrorist attack against French interests. He said his country's nuclear arsenal had been reconfigured to include the ability to make a tactical strike in retaliation for terrorism.

Chirac criticised the Israeli offensive into Lebanon on 14 July 2006. However, Israeli Army Radio later reported that Chirac had secretly told Israeli prime minister Ehud Olmert that France would support an Israeli invasion of Syria and the overthrow of the government of President Bashar al-Assad, promising to veto any moves against Israel in the United Nations or European Union. Whereas the disagreement on Iraq had caused a rift between Paris and Washington, recent analysis suggests that both governments worked closely together on the Syria file to end the Syrian occupation of Lebanon, and that Chirac was a driver of this diplomatic cooperation.

In July 2006, the G8 met to discuss international energy concerns. Despite the rising awareness of global warming issues, the G8 focused on "energy security" issues. Chirac continued to be the voice within the G8 summit meetings to support international action to curb global warming and climate change concerns. Chirac warned that "humanity is dancing on a volcano" and called for serious action by the world's leading industrialised nations.

After Chirac's death in 2019, the street leading to the Louvre Abu Dhabi was named Jacques Chirac Street in November 2019 in celebration of Chirac's efforts to bolster links between France and the United Arab Emirates during his presidency.

Chirac espoused a staunchly pro-Moroccan policy, and the already established pro-Moroccan French stances vis-à-vis the Western Sahara conflict were strengthened during his presidential tenure.

Flight tax 
Chirac requested the Landau-report (published in September 2004) and combined with the Report of the Technical Group on Innovative Financing Mechanisms formulated upon request by the Heads of State of Brazil, Chile, France and Spain (issued in December 2004), these documents present various opportunities for innovative financing mechanisms while equally stressing the advantages (stability and predictability) of tax-based models. The UNITAID project was born. Today the organisation's executive board is chaired by Marisol Touraine.

2005 referendum on TCE 

On 29 May 2005, a referendum was held in France to decide whether the country should ratify the proposed treaty for a Constitution of the European Union (TCE). The result was a victory for the No campaign, with 55 per cent of voters rejecting the treaty on a turnout of 69 per cent, dealing a devastating blow to Chirac and the Union for a Popular Movement (UMP) party, and to part of the centre-left which had supported the TCE. Following the referendum defeat, Chirac replaced his prime minister Jean-Pierre Raffarin with Dominique de Villepin. In an address to the nation, Chirac declared that the new cabinet's top priority was to curb unemployment, which was consistently hovering above 10 per cent, calling for a "national mobilisation" to that effect.

2005 civil unrest and CPE protests 

Following major student protests in spring 2006, which followed civil unrest in autumn 2005 after the death of two young boys in Clichy-sous-Bois, one of the poorest communes in Paris' suburbs, Chirac retracted the proposed First Employment Contract (CPE) by "promulgating [it] without applying it", an unheard-of – and, some claim, illegal – move intended to appease the protesters while giving the appearance of not making a  regarding the contract, and therefore to continue his support for his prime minister Dominique de Villepin.

Retirement 
In early September 2005, Chirac suffered an event that his doctors described as a "vascular incident". It was officially reported as a "minor stroke" or a mild stroke (also known as a transient ischemic attack). He recovered and returned to his duties soon afterward.

In a pre-recorded television broadcast aired on 11 March 2007, he announced, in a widely predicted move, that he would not choose to seek a third term as president. (In 2000 the constitution had been amended to reduce the length of the presidential term to five years, so his second term was shorter than his first.) "My whole life has been committed to serving France, and serving peace", Chirac said, adding that he would find new ways to serve France after leaving office. He did not explain the reasons for his decision. He did not, during the broadcast, endorse any of the candidates running for election, but did devote several minutes of his talk to a plea against extremist politics that was considered a thinly disguised invocation to voters not to vote for Jean-Marie Le Pen and a recommendation to Nicolas Sarkozy not to orient his campaign so as to include themes traditionally associated with Le Pen.

Post-presidency and death 

Shortly after leaving office, he launched the Fondation Chirac in June 2008. Since then it has been striving for peace through five advocacy programmes: conflict prevention, access to water and sanitation, access to quality medicines and healthcare, access to land resources, and preservation of cultural diversity. It supports field projects that involve local people and provide concrete and innovative solutions. Chirac chaired the jury for the Prize for Conflict Prevention awarded every year by his foundation.

As a former president of France, he was entitled to a lifetime pension and personal security protection, and was an ex officio member for life of the Constitutional Council. He sat for the first time on the council on 15 November 2007, six months after leaving the presidency. During the Didier Schuller affair, the latter accused Hariri of having participated in illegal funding of the RPR's political campaigns, but the judge closed the case without further investigations.

In Volume 2 of his memoirs published in June 2011, Chirac mocked his successor Nicolas Sarkozy as "irritable, rash, impetuous, disloyal, ungrateful, and un-French". Chirac wrote that he considered firing Sarkozy previously, and conceded responsibility in allowing Jean-Marie Le Pen to advance in 2002. A poll conducted in 2010 suggested Chirac was the most admired political figure in France, while Sarkozy was 32nd.

On 11 April 2008, Chirac's office announced that he had undergone successful surgery to fit a pacemaker.

Chirac suffered from frail health and memory loss in later life. In February 2014 he was admitted to hospital because of pains related to gout. On 10 December 2015, Chirac was hospitalised in Paris for undisclosed reasons, although his state of health did not "give any cause for concern", he remained for about a week in ICU. According to his son-in-law Frederic Salat-Baroux, Chirac was again hospitalised in Paris with a lung infection on 18 September 2016.

Death and state funeral

Chirac died at his home in Paris on 26 September 2019, surrounded by his family. A requiem mass was held at Saint-Sulpice on 30 September, celebrated by Michel Aupetit, Archbishop of Paris, and attended by representatives from about 175 countries, included 69 past and present heads of state, government and international organisations. Notable names included António Guterres, Jean-Claude Juncker, Jens Stoltenberg, Vladimir Putin, Sergio Mattarella, Frank-Walter Steinmeier, Charles Michel, Viktor Orbán, Recep Tayyip Erdoğan, Saad Hariri, Borut Pahor, Salome Zourabichvili, Tony Blair, Jean Chrétien, Vaira Vike-Freiberga, Bill Clinton, Hamid Karzai, Dai Bingguo  plus many ministers.

The day was declared a national day of mourning in France and a minute of silence was held nationwide at 15:00. Following the public ceremony, Chirac was buried at Montparnasse Cemetery, with only close family in attendance. Andorra announced three days of national mourning. Lebanon declared the day of the ex-president's funeral national day of mourning.

Popular culture 

Chirac was a major supporter of the nation's film industry.

Because of Jacques Chirac's long public career, he was often parodied or caricatured: Young Jacques Chirac is the basis of a young, dashing bureaucrat character in the 1976 Asterix comic strip album Obelix and Co., proposing methods to quell Gallic unrest to elderly, old-style Roman politicians.

He was originally portrayed as a rather likeable, though overexcited, character; following the corruption allegations, however, he was depicted as a kind of dilettante and incompetent who pilfered public money and lied through his teeth. His character for a while developed a superhero alter ego,  ('super liar') to get him out of embarrassing situations.

He was given the Ig Nobel prize for peace, for commemorating the fiftieth anniversary of Hiroshima with atomic bomb tests in the Pacific (1996).

Portrayals in film 

J. Grant Albrecht voices Chirac in the Oliver Stone film W. Marc Rioufol plays him in Richard Loncraine's 2010 film The Special Relationship.

Controversies

Osirak controversy 
At the invitation of Saddam Hussein (then vice-president of Iraq, but de facto dictator), Chirac made an official visit to Baghdad in 1975. Saddam approved a deal granting French oil companies a number of privileges plus a 23-percent share of Iraqi oil. As part of this deal, France sold Iraq the Osirak MTR nuclear reactor, designed to test nuclear materials.

The Israeli Air Force alleged that the reactor's imminent commissioning was a threat to its security, and pre-emptively bombed the Osirak reactor on 7 June 1981, provoking considerable anger from French officials and the United Nations Security Council.

The Osirak deal became a controversy again in 2002–2003, when an international military coalition led by the United States invaded Iraq and forcibly removed Hussein's government from power. France led several other European countries in an effort to prevent the invasion. The Osirak deal was then used by parts of the American media to criticise the Chirac-led opposition to starting a war in Iraq, despite French involvement in the Gulf War.

Conviction for corruption 
Chirac has been named in several cases of alleged corruption that occurred during his term as mayor, some of which have led to felony convictions of some politicians and aides. However, a controversial judicial decision in 1999 granted Chirac immunity while he was president of France. He refused to testify on these matters, arguing that it would be incompatible with his presidential functions. Investigations concerning the running of Paris's city hall, the number of whose municipal employees increased by 25% from 1977 to 1995 (with 2,000 out of approximately 35,000 coming from the  region where Chirac had held his seat as deputy), as well as a lack of financial transparency ( and the communal debt, were thwarted by the legal impossibility of questioning him as president.

Thousands of people were invited each year to receptions in the Paris city hall, while many political, media and artistic personalities were hosted in private flats owned by the city.

Chirac's immunity from prosecution ended in May 2007, when he left office as president. In November 2007 a preliminary charge of misuse of public funds was filed against him. Chirac is said to be the first former French head of state to be formally placed under investigation for a crime. On 30 October 2009, a judge ordered Chirac to stand trial on embezzlement charges, dating back to his time as mayor of Paris.

On 7 March 2011, he went on trial on charges of diverting public funds, accused of giving fictional city jobs to 28 activists from his political party while serving as the mayor of Paris (1977–95). Along with Chirac, nine others stood trial in two separate cases, one dealing with fictional jobs for 21 people and the other with jobs for the remaining seven. The President of Union for a Popular Movement, who later served as France's Minister of Foreign Affairs, Alain Juppé, was sentenced to a 14-month suspended prison sentence for the same case in 2004.

On 15 December 2011, Chirac was found guilty and given a suspended sentence of two years. He was convicted of diverting public funds, abuse of trust and illegal conflict of interest. The suspended sentence meant he did not have to go to prison, and took into account his age, health, and status as a former head of state. He did not attend his trial, since medical doctors deemed that his neurological problems damaged his memory. His defence team decided not to appeal.

The Clearstream Affair 

During April and May 2006, Chirac's administration was beset by a crisis as his chosen prime minister, Dominique de Villepin, was accused of asking Philippe Rondot, a top level French spy, for a secret investigation into Villepin's chief political rival, Nicolas Sarkozy, in 2004. This matter has been called the second Clearstream Affair. On 10 May 2006, following a Cabinet meeting, Chirac made a rare television appearance to try to protect Villepin from the scandal and to debunk allegations that Chirac himself had set up a Japanese bank account containing 300 million francs in 1992 as Mayor of Paris. Chirac said that "The Republic is not a dictatorship of rumours, a dictatorship of calumny."

Personal life 
In 1956, Chirac married Bernadette Chodron de Courcel, with whom he had two daughters:  (4 March 195814 April 2016) and Claude (born 6 December 1962). Claude was a long-term public relations assistant and personal adviser to her father, while Laurence, who suffered from anorexia nervosa in her youth, did not participate in her father's political activities. Chirac was the grandfather of Martin Rey-Chirac by the relationship of Claude with French judoka Thierry Rey. A former Vietnamese refugee, Anh Dao Traxel, is a foster daughter of Jacques and Bernadette Chirac.

Chirac remained married, but had many other relationships.

Chirac was a close friend of actor Gregory Peck.

Academic works 
The 182-page typewritten work, supervised by Professor Jean Chardonnet, is illustrated by photographs, sketches and diagrams.

Political career 

 President of the French Republic: 1995–2007. Reelected in 2002.
 Member of the Constitutional Council of France: Since 2007.

Governmental functions 
 Prime minister: 1974–76 (Resignation) / 1986–88.
 Minister of Interior: March–May 1974.
 Minister of Agriculture and Rural Development: 1972–74.
 Minister of Relation with Parliament: 1971–72.
 Secretary of State for Economy and Finance: 1968–71.
 Secretary of State for Social Affairs: 1967–68.

Electoral mandates

European Parliament 
 Member of European Parliament: 1979–80 (Resignation). Elected in 1979.

National Assembly of France 
Elected in 1967, reelected in 1968, 1973, 1976, 1981, 1986, 1988, 1993: Member for Corrèze: March–April 1967 (became Secretary of State in April 1967), reelected in 1968, 1973, but he remained a minister in 1976–1986 (became prime minister in 1986), 1988–95 (resigned to become President of the French Republic in 1995).

General Council 
 President of the General Council of Corrèze: 1970–1979. Reelected in 1973, 1976.
 General councillor of Corrèze: 1968–88. Reelected in 1970, 1976, 1982.

Municipal Council 
 Mayor of Paris: 1977–95 (Resignation, became President of the French Republic in 1995). Reelected in 1983, 1989.
 Councillor of Paris: 1977–1995 (Resignation). Reelected in 1983, 1989.
 Municipal councillor of Sainte-Féréole: 1965–77. Reelected in 1971.

Political function 
 President of the Rally for the Republic: 1976–94 (Resignation).

Ministries

First Chirac ministry 

(27 May 1974 – 25 August 1976)
 Jacques Chirac – Prime Minister
 Jean Sauvagnargues – Minister of Foreign Affairs
  – Minister of Defence
 Michel Poniatowski – Minister of the Interior
 Jean-Pierre Fourcade – Minister of Economy and Finance
 Michel d'Ornano – Minister of Industry, Tourism, Posts, and Telecommunications
 Michel Durafour – Minister of Employment and Social Affairs
 Jean Lecanuet – Minister of Justice
 René Haby – Minister of National Education
 Simone Veil – Minister of Health
 Christian Bonnet – Minister of Agriculture
  – Minister of External Trade
 Robert Galley – Minister of Equipment
  – Minister of Trade and Craft
 Pierre Abelin – Minister of Cooperation
 Jean-Jacques Servan-Schreiber – Minister of Reforms
  – Minister of Quality of Life

Second Chirac ministry 

(20 March 1986 – 12 May 1988)
 Jacques Chirac – Prime Minister
 Jean-Bernard Raimond – Minister of Foreign Affairs
 André Giraud – Minister of Defence
 Charles Pasqua – Minister of the Interior
 Édouard Balladur – Minister of State, Minister of Economy, Finance, and Privatisation
 Alain Madelin – Minister of Industry, Tourism, Posts, and Telecommunications
 Philippe Séguin – Minister of Employment and Social Affairs
 Albin Chalandon – Minister of Justice
 René Monory – Minister of National Education
 François Léotard – Minister of Culture and Communications
 François Guillaume – Minister of Agriculture
 Bernard Pons – Minister of Overseas Departments and Territories
 Pierre Méhaignerie – Minister of Housing, Equipment, Regional Planning, and Transport
 André Rossinot – Minister for Relations with Parliament
 Michel Aurillac – Minister of Cooperation

Honours

National honours

Foreign honours

Publications
 , Paris, ed. Stock, 1978
 , Paris, ed. La Table ronde, 1978
  (With Alain Berger), Paris, ed. Albatros, 1984
 , Paris, ed. Albin Michel, 1988
 , Paris, ed. NiL, 1994
 , Paris, ed. NiL Éditions, 1995
 , Paris, ed. Odile Jacob, 2006
 , Paris, ed. Presses universitaires du Nouveau Monde, 2007
 , Paris, ed. Odile Jacob, 2007
 , Paris, ed. Desclée de Brouwer, 2008
 , Paris, ed. NiL, 2009
 , Paris, ed. NiL Éditions, 2011

See also 
 1995 French presidential election
 Musée du Président Jacques Chirac
 Musée du Quai Branly – Jacques Chirac

References

Further reading 
 Allport, Alan. Jacques Chirac (Infobase Publishing, 2007), short biography excerpt
 Bell, David et al. eds. Biographical Dictionary of French Political Leaders Since 1870 (1990) pp 82–86.
 Bell, David. Presidential Power in Fifth Republic France (2000) pp 211–40.
 Bell, David S., Erwin C. Hargrove, and Kevin Theakston. "Skill in context: A comparison of politicians." Presidential Studies Quarterly 29.3 (1999): 528–548; comparison of George Bush (US), John Major (UK), and Jacques Chirac.
 Chafer, Tony. "Chirac and ': No longer a family affair." Modern & Contemporary France 13.1 (2005): 7-23. online 
 Drake, Helen. "Jacques chirac's balancing acts: The French right and Europe." South European Society & Politics 10.2 (2005): 297–313.
 Elgie, Robert. ": studying the 1997–2002 experience." Modern & Contemporary France (2002) 10#3 pp 297–31, in English.
 Gaffney, John. "The Mainstream Right: Chirac and Balladur." in  French Presidentialism and the Election of 1995 (Routledge, 2018) pp. 99–115.
 Gaffney, John. "Protocol, Image, and Discourse in Political leadership Competition: the case of prime minister Lionel Jospin, 1997-2002." Modern & Contemporary France 10.3 (2002): 313–323.
 Gaffney, John, ed. The French presidential and legislative elections of 2002 (Routledge, 2018).
 Knapp, Andrew. "Jacques Chirac: Surviving without Leading?." in David Bell and John Gaffney, eds. The presidents of the French Fifth Republic (Palgrave Macmillan UK, 2013). pp 159–180.
 Levy, Jonah, Alistair Cole, and Patrick Le Galès. "From Chirac to Sarkozy. A New France." Developments in French politics 4 (2008): 1-21.
 Maclean, Mairi. Economic Management and French Business: From de Gaulle to Chirac (Springer, 2002).
 Milzow, Katrin. National interests and European integration: Discourse and politics of Blair, Chirac and Schroeder (Palgrave Macmillan, 2012).
 Nester, William R. "President Chirac." in Nester, De Gaulle's Legacy (Palgrave Macmillan 2014) pp. 151–172.
 Wilsford, David, ed. Political leaders of contemporary Western Europe: a biographical dictionary (Greenwood, 1995) pp 63–70.

Primary sources 
 Chirac, Jacques. My Life in Politics (2012).

In French 
 Emmanuel Hecht, Thierry Vey, 
 Valéry Giscard d'Estaing, 
 Frederic Lepage, 
  
 Jacques Chirac,

External links 
 
 
 Some of Jacques Chirac's quotations 

Jacques Chirac
1932 births
2019 deaths
20th-century presidents of France
21st-century presidents of France
20th-century Princes of Andorra
21st-century Princes of Andorra
École nationale d'administration alumni
Former Marxists
French anti-communists
French Army officers
French fraudsters
French interior ministers
French military personnel of the Algerian War
French Ministers of Agriculture
French politicians convicted of crimes
French Roman Catholics
Government of Andorra
Chevaliers of the Ordre des Arts et des Lettres
Collars of the Order of the White Lion
Grand Collars of the Order of Prince Henry
Grand Croix of the Légion d'honneur
Grand Cross of the Ordre national du Mérite
Grand Crosses of the Order of the Lithuanian Grand Duke Gediminas
Grand Crosses of the Order of Vytautas the Great
Harvard Summer School alumni
Honorary Knights Grand Cross of the Order of the Bath
Knights Grand Cross with Collar of the Order of Merit of the Italian Republic
Knights of the Order of Agricultural Merit
Lycée Carnot alumni
Lycée Louis-le-Grand alumni
Mayors of Paris
Officers of the National Order of Quebec
People convicted of misusing public funds
Politicians of the French Fifth Republic
Prime Ministers of France
Recipients of the Aeronautical Medal
Recipients of the Collar of the Order of the Cross of Terra Mariana
Recipients of the Cross for Military Valour
Recipients of the Grand Star of the Decoration for Services to the Republic of Austria
Recipients of the Heydar Aliyev Order
Recipients of the National Order of Merit (Malta)
Recipients of the Order "For Merit to the Fatherland", 1st class
Recipients of the Order pro Merito Melitensi
Sciences Po alumni
State Prize of the Russian Federation laureates
Candidates in the 1981 French presidential election
Candidates in the 1988 French presidential election
Candidates in the 1995 French presidential election
Candidates in the 2002 French presidential election
Burials at Montparnasse Cemetery
Heads of government who were later imprisoned
Recipients of the Medal of the Oriental Republic of Uruguay
First Class of the Order of the Star of Romania